North Water Bridge Halt railway station served the village of St Cyrus, Aberdeenshire, Scotland from 1866 to 1951 on the Montrose and Bervie Railway.

History 
The station opened in July 1866 by the Scottish North Eastern Railway. The viaduct was to the south. The station closed to both passengers and goods traffic on 1 October 1951.

References

External links 

Disused railway stations in Aberdeenshire
Former North British Railway stations
Railway stations in Great Britain opened in 1866
Railway stations in Great Britain closed in 1951
1866 establishments in Scotland
1951 disestablishments in Scotland